Björn Borg was the defending champion and successfully defended his title, defeating Jimmy Connors in the final, 6–2, 6–2.

Seeds

  Björn Borg (champion)
  Jimmy Connors (final)
  Roscoe Tanner (first round)
  Vitas Gerulaitis (semifinals)
  Guillermo Vilas (first round)
  Tim Gullikson (quarterfinals)
  Pat Du Pré (first round)
  Yannick Noah (quarterfinals)

Draw

Finals

Top half

Bottom half

References

 Main Draw

1979 Grand Prix (tennis)
Tokyo Indoor